Francis Charles Granville Egerton, 3rd Earl of Ellesmere VD, DL, JP (5 April 1847 – 13 July 1914), styled Viscount Brackley between 1857 and 1862, was a British peer, soldier and author from the Egerton family. He owned several racehorses and  land.

Background
Born in London, he was the eldest son of the George Egerton, 2nd Earl of Ellesmere, and his wife, Lady Mary Louisa, the youngest daughter of John Campbell, 1st Earl Cawdor. In 1862, aged only fifteen, he succeeded his father as earl. Egerton was educated at Eton College and then at Trinity College, Cambridge, where he graduated with Bachelor of Arts in 1867.

Career
On 13 May 1864 Egerton was commissioned as a cornet in the part-time Duke of Lancaster's Own Yeomanry, in which his father had previously served and which was commanded by his uncle, the Hon Algernon Egerton. He was promoted to captain in 1869 From 14 April 1875 he also served as Lieutenant-Colonel Commandant of the 40th (3rd Manchester) Lancashire Rifle Volunteer Corps (later the 4th Volunteer Battalion, Manchester Regiment) in succession to his uncle.

He was granted an honorary majorship in the Duke of Lancaster's Yeomanry in July 1884 and was confirmed to the full rank in October. Two years later, Egerton became an honorary lieutenant-colonel and in January 1891 received command of the regiment.

In March 1891 he retired from the Volunteers and he was appointed Honorary Colonel of the 4th Volunteer Battalion, Manchester Regiment (later the 7th Battalion Manchester Regiment in the Territorial Force). He retired from the Yeomanry in January 1896 and became the regiment's honorary colonel two months later. Egerton received the Volunteer Decoration (VD) in November that year.

He was appointed a Knight of Grace of the Venerable Order of Saint John in 1908 and was advanced to a Knight of Justice in 1910. Egerton was a Justice of the Peace for the counties of Lancaster and Northampton and a Deputy Lieutenant of Lancashire.

Family
On 9 December 1868, he married Lady Katherine Louisa Phipps, second daughter of George Phipps, 2nd Marquess of Normanby. They had eleven children, six daughters and five sons. 
 Lady Mabel Laura Egerton (16 December 1869 – 25 November 1946)
 Lady Alice Constance Egerton (12 November 1870 – 6 November 1932)
 Lady Beatrice Mary Egerton, MBE (5 November 1871 – 7 September 1966); married George Kemp, 1st Baron Rochdale 
 John Francis Granville Scrope Egerton, 4th Earl of Ellesmere (14 November 1872 – 24 August 1944)
 Major Hon. Francis William George Egerton, Duke of Lancaster's Own Yeomanry, (4 December 1874 – 4 April 1948)
 Hon. Thomas Henry Frederick Egerton (10 September 1876 – 1 October 1953); married 1902 Lady Bertha Anson, daughter of 3rd Earl of Lichfield
 Lady Katherine Augusta Victoria Egerton, DGStJ (2 December 1877 – 27 October 1960); married Charles Hardy, JP (d. 11 November 1940)
 Lt-Col Hon. Wilfred Charles William Egerton, Royal Air Force (21 September 1879 – 27 December 1939)
 Lady Leila Georgina Egerton (23 December 1881 – 22 August 1964)
 Lady Helen Constance Egerton (24 September 1884 – 3 April 1901)
 Hon. Reginald Arthur Egerton (6 July 1886 – 13 September 1904).

Egerton died in 1914 and was succeeded in his titles by his eldest son, John. His wife survived him until 1926.

Works
Sir Hector's Watch
A Broken Stirrup-Leather
A Sapphire Ring
Mrs John Foster

References

1847 births
1914 deaths
People educated at Eton College
British racehorse owners and breeders
Deputy Lieutenants of Lancashire
Earls in the Peerage of the United Kingdom
English justices of the peace
Knights of Justice of the Order of St John
Francis
Francis
Duke of Lancaster's Own Yeomanry officers
Manchester Regiment officers